Hallucis brevis muscle may refer to:

 Extensor hallucis brevis muscle
 Flexor hallucis brevis muscle